Midland is an unincorporated community in Crawford County, in the U.S. state of Missouri. The community was located along Missouri Route 8 near the Missouri Route TT intersection approximately two miles east of Steelville. The Midland School was about one-half mile to the northwest on a bluff above Whittenburg Creek.

History
A post office called Midland was established in 1875, and remained in operation until 1896. The community took its name from the Midland Blast Furnace Company.

References

Unincorporated communities in Crawford County, Missouri
Unincorporated communities in Missouri